Giacomo Pozzer (born 19 February 2001) is an Italian professional footballer who plays as a goalkeeper for Serie D club Matera Grumentum.

Club career
On 24 August 2022, Pozzer moved to Matera Grumentum in Serie D.

Career statistics

References

2001 births
Living people
People from Mirano
Sportspeople from the Metropolitan City of Venice
Footballers from Veneto
Italian footballers
Association football goalkeepers
Inter Milan players
S.S. Monopoli 1966 players
Lucchese 1905 players
S.S. Juve Stabia players
F.C. Matera players
Serie C players
Serie D players
Italy youth international footballers